Livestock Improvement Corporation, or LIC, is a New Zealand multinational farmer-owned co-operative which, for more than 100 years, has provided genetics expertise, information and technology to the dairy sector, aimed at improving the prosperity and productivity of farmers.

LIC has headquarters in Newstead, near Hamilton, regional bases throughout the country, offices in the United Kingdom, Ireland, USA and Australia, and agents in South Africa and Asia.
 
The co-operative is listed on the New Zealand stock exchange, with 11,000 NZ dairy farmer shareholders.

LIC has its roots in 1909, when the first organised routine herd testing service was conducted by and for New Zealand dairy farmers, with the support of the New Zealand Department of Agriculture. Since then, it has grown to become a major enabler and contributor for the New Zealand dairy sector, with over 75% of all dairy cows within New Zealand being sired by LIC-owned bulls.

Notable people
Notable people who work for or who have worked for the corporation include:
 Jennie Pryce, a quantitative geneticist

References

Dairy products companies of New Zealand
Agricultural cooperatives
Companies based in Hamilton, New Zealand
Cooperatives in New Zealand